TWA usually refers to Trans World Airlines, a US airline whose assets were acquired by American Airlines in 2001. 

TWA may also refer to:

 Twa, a group of Pygmy peoples in Africa
 T wave alternans, a variation in the T wave in an electrocardiogram
 Teeny Weeny Afro, a popular hairstyle among women with textured hair
 Texas Wrestling Academy, a professional wrestling training school
 Tri-State Wrestling Alliance, a professional wrestling promotion that would eventually become Extreme Championship Wrestling
 Time-weighted average (PEL), a permissible exposure limit in the United States
 Time-weighted average price, the average price of a security over a specified time
 Transport and Works Act 1992, a piece of UK legislation concerning public transport 
 "TWA" (song), by Ted Hawkins on the 1982 album Watch Your Step
 True wind angle, in sailing, the wind direction as seen by a stationary observer